The Rhode House (Danish: Den Rhodeske Gård) is a historic property located at the corner of Strandgade (No. 14) and Torvegade in the Christianshavn neighbourhood of central Copenhagen, Denmark.

History

17th century
The property was part of a large lot at present-day No. 8–14. No. 14 was sold off to statholder Frantz Rantzow in 1630.In 1632, he was appointed to Steward of the Realm but died later that same year. It is believed that the house was built in about 1640 for Nahman Hiort, one of the first Councilmen of the new market town which had been incorporated on 8 June 1639. Nahman Hiort owned both No. 14 and No. 12 from 1642 to 1653. The next owner was baker Jens Sørensen. whose widow owned the property until 1668.  The property was listed as No. 15 in Christianshavn Qyarter in Copenhagen's first cadastre of 1689. It was at that time owned by brewer Anders Svendsen.

18th century

Strandgade 12 was sold off in 1702. It was listed as No. 31 in the new cadastre of 1756. It was at that time owned by wine seller (vintapper) Rasmus Rohde. In 1781, it was passed to his son Mathias Rohde. He expanded the house with two extra floors in 1785 (some sources say 1794) and operated a tavern in the cellar.

The property was home to 18 residents in two households at the 1898 census.  Mathias Rode resided in the building with his wife Maria Catarina Kalder, their two daughters (aged eight and 11), a clerk, two wine merchant's apprentices, two maids and two caretakers. Giertrud Rode, Rohde's mother, resided in the building with her Sissilia Margrete Rosted and nine-year-old granddaughter Giertrud Rosted, 12-year-old Mathilde Catarine Amorspil, 30-year-old Annette Dømene and two maids.

19th century
 
 
On 11 February 1798, Jacob Kaarsberg (1752-1819) established a wine trading company in the building. The company, Vinhuset af 1898, was later continued by his son P. A. Kaarsberg (1791-1866) and then by Wilh. Schreiber (died 1876). The Kaarsberg family owned the building until 1877. The company existed well into the 2+th century but had by then relocated to Amagerbrogade 15.

The property was home to 37 residents in four households at the 1801 census.Hans Sørensen, a 35-year-old unmarried wine merchant, resided in the building with two wine merchant's apprentices, a male servant, a maid, a clerk and a merchant. Ole Hielte, a bookkeeper, resided in the building with his wife Knudine Cathrine Hielte, their 12 children (aged one to 17, a wet nirse and three maids. The younger son, who had been born in the building on 18 November 1798, would later become a writer, publishing under the pseudonym Carl Bernhard. He was a cousin of Johan Ludvig Heiberg. Friderich Julius Christian Saint Aubain, an artillery captain, resided in the building with his wife Ane Bolette Saint Aubain, their two sons (aged one and three), a wet nurse, a maid and the grocer (urtekræmmer) Peter Hansen.

Friderich Ludevig Flycke, a bookkeeper, resided in the building with his wife 
Johanne Marie Flycke, their two daughters (aged five and nine) and one maid.

Pastor Nicolai G. Blædel, a co-founder of Indre Mission in Copenhagen, lived in the building from 1845 to 1846. The naval officer Edouard Suenson  lived in the building in the beginning of the 1850s.

Architecture
The building consists of four floors and a cellar. Eight bays front Strandgade while six bays front Torvegade. The two uppermost floors and two of the bays along Strandgade date from the 1794 expansion. The facade is red-washed with sandstone details. The portal is decorated with bunches of grapes.

References

External links
 Niels Brocks Gård at indenforvoldene.dk

Houses in Copenhagen
Listed residential buildings in Copenhagen
Listed buildings and structures in Christianshavn
Houses completed in 1794